Eva-Maria Neher (née Ruhr, born 22 November 1950) is a German scientist in the fields of biochemistry and microbiology. She founded the Göttingen Xlab and has been its Executive Director since 2000. The Göttingen Xlab is an experimental laboratory for training young people from student to scientist level. She is married to Erwin Neher who is a Nobel laureate for his Nobel Prize in Physiology or Medicine. She is the recipient of many awards including the Lower Saxony State Prize.

Biography 
Neher was born in Mülheim, Germany. Her initial academic education as an undergraduate in microbiology was from 1969 to 1973 at the University of Göttingen. She received her diploma in biology in 1974, earning a PhD on biochemistry from the same university; her thesis was Regulation of the biosynthesis of poly-beta-hydroxybutyrate in Alcaligenes eutrophus H 16. She then worked in the same university as a staff scientist in 1977. From 1977–78 she also undertook postdoctoral research at the Max Planck Institute for Biophysical Chemistry in the Molecular Biology Department, Göttingen. While at the Charles Stevens Laboratory at Yale University for post-doctoral work she met Ernst Neher. She worked in his "Young Investigations Lab" and married him on 26 December 1978. Their five children – Richard, Benjamin, Carola, Sigmund, and Margret – were born by 1991. From 1978–1985 she was Staff Scientist at the Institute for Physiological Chemistry at the Georg August University and then till 2000 she was on maternal leave. During this period she also taught experimental courses in chemistry and biology at the Free Waldorf School, Göttingen. It was here she developed her approach for the Xlab which she founded in 2000, an experimental laboratory for young people. She has been its Managing and Executive Director ever since. Xlab has been housed in a separate building on the North Campus since 2004.

When Neher was a professor at the University of Göttingen, she visited Moscow in June 1999. In 2013, she was a participant in the International Education Forum Hi-Tech Show in Moscow.

Awards 
Neher has received many awards, including:
Niedersächsischer Verdienstorden (Lower Saxony Order of Merit) in 2002
GBM-Kommunikationspreis, Gesellschaft für Biochemie und Molekularbiologie e.V.  (GBM Communication Award of the German Society for Biochemistry and Molecular Biology) in 2005
Niedersächsischer Staatspreis (Lower Saxony State Prize) in 2007
Honorary professorship, Department of Chemistry, Georg August University, Göttingen in 2009
Bundesverdienstkreuz 1. Klasse (Federal Cross of Merit First class) in 2009

References

Bibliography 

Living people
1950 births
Women microbiologists
German biochemists
German women biochemists
German microbiologists
Scientists from Mannheim
University of Göttingen alumni
Academic staff of the University of Göttingen
21st-century German women scientists
Officers Crosses of the Order of Merit of the Federal Republic of Germany